Ricky Jones may refer to:

Ricky Jones (baseball) (born 1958), baseball infielder
Ricky Jones (American football) (born 1955), American football player

See also
Rickie Lee Jones (born 1954), American vocalist, musician, songwriter, and producer
Rick Jones (disambiguation)
Richard Jones (disambiguation)